The British Columbia Rugby Union (BCRU) is the provincial administrative body for rugby union in British Columbia, Canada. The BCRU consists of nine sub-unions and 65 clubs. It was originally organized in New Westminster in 1889 where Alfred St. George Hamersley, the former England rugby union captain and recent immigrant to Vancouver, and member of Vancouver Football (Rugby) Club, became the first President. The same man is credited with founding the Amateur Athletic Club of British Columbia. and previously had introduced the game of rugby to the youth of South Canterbury, New Zealand. The current headquarters is on the west side of Vancouver.

British Columbia is considered a hotspot for rugby in Canada, as its mild weather allows the sport to be played year round.

The BCRU is responsible for organizing the British Columbia Premier League, the provincial men's club championship, and the Ruth Hellerud-Brown Senior Women's Premier Competition. It also oversees provincial representative teams which compete for national championships organized by Rugby Canada.

The BCRU also has a British Columbia Rugby Hall of Fame.

The BC Premier League
The BC Premier League is the highest level of amateur rugby in British Columbia. Many current and former Canadian internationals have participated in the league as well as number of high level foreign born players. The champions of the league's playoff system is awarded the Rounsefell Cup.

Participating Clubs (2021–22)
The BC Premier League is open to a maximum of 12 teams and features the following clubs from Vancouver Island, Washington state and the Lower Mainland.

Province Wide First Division

Participating Clubs (2021-22) 
The Province Wide First Division includes 6 teams from Vancouver Island, the Lower Mainland and the Fraser Valley.

Province Wide Second Division

Participating Clubs (2018–19) 
The Province Wide Second Division includes 11 teams, with reserve sides from clubs in both the Province Wide First Division and the BC Premier League as well as the following clubs from the Lower Mainland, the Thompson-Okanagan region and the Fraser Valley.

Province Wide Third Division

Participating Clubs (2018–19) 
The Province Wide Third Division is split into 5 conferences, the Mainland League, the Island League, the Okanagan League, the Kootenay League and the Interior League. The Mainland and Island leagues compete during the fall, winter and spring while the Okanagan, Kootenay and Interior leagues compete during the spring and summer. The champions of the league's 5 conferences play for the Saratoga Cup each Fall.

Mainland League 
This league includes 12 teams, with reserve sides from clubs in the Province Wide First Division, the Province Wide Second Division and the BC Premier League as well as the following clubs from the Lower Mainland and the Fraser Valley.

Island League 
This league includes 4 teams, with reserve sides from clubs in the BC Premier League as well as the following club from Vancouver Island.

Interior League 
This league includes 4 teams from the Cariboo, Skeena, Northern Interior and North Coast.

See also
Rugby Canada
Fraser Valley Rugby Union
Vancouver Rugby Union
British Columbia Men's Premier League
Coastal Cup

References

External links
 Official website

 
Rugby union governing bodies in Canada
Rugby
Sports organizations established in 1889
1889 establishments in British Columbia